Phyllis Hill (October 27, 1920 – January 1, 1993) was an American dancer and actress.

Early years
Hill was born in New York City. Her mother was actress Peggy Johnson Hill. Her sister, Joyce Hill Rainier, danced with the Monte Carlo Ballets Russes.

Hill began her career in the late 1940s, appearing on stage and in small television roles in New York.

Stage
Her theatrical debut came "as one of George Balanchine's 'Baby Ballerinas' in New York." Her Broadway credits include Rosalinda, Cyrano de Bergerac, The Fifth Season, The Alchemist (1947), Angel Street (1947), Volpone (1947), Helen Goes to Troy (1943), What's Up? (1943) and Sons and Soldiers (1942).

She also appeared with the Metropolitan Opera Company ballet as well as Radio City Music Hall's Ballet Corps.

Television
Hill portrayed Poco Thurman in the NBC drama Three Steps to Heaven,, Mrs. Allison in the NBC serial Morning Star, and Agnes Adams in the ABC comedy That Girl.

Among Hill's television appearances were three Dr. Kildare shows during the 1964–1965 season, three Perry Mason episodes during the final three years of the series, including the title roles of Katherine Stewart in "The Case of the Wednesday Woman", and murderer Rachel Gordon in "The Case of the Sleepy Slayer" (both in 1964), and four appearances on The F.B.I. (1966–70).

Marriages
She was married twice, both times to actors and both unions were childless:
José Ferrer (June 19, 1948 – July 7, 1953; divorced)
Frank Overton (1962 – 24 April 1967; his death)

Death
Hill died from lung cancer in Los Angeles on New Year's Day 1993, aged 72. She was survived by a niece.

Filmography

References

External links
 
 
 

1920 births
1993 deaths
Actresses from New York City
American ballerinas
American television actresses
Deaths from lung cancer in California
20th-century American actresses
Ferrer family (acting)
20th-century American ballet dancers